The Shenzhen–Zhongshan Bridge is a bridge under construction. It will connect two major cities on the Pearl River Delta (PRD) in China: the city of Shenzhen on the eastern side of the PRD, and the city of Zhongshan on the western side. It will consist of a series of bridges and tunnels, starting from Bao'an International Airport on the Shenzhen side. 

The proposed 51 km eight-lane link is scheduled to be completed in 2024 and is expected to cost around US$4.83 billion. It will be located about 27 km downriver from the Humen Bridge, the only current bridge crossing of the estuary, and some 32 km north of the new Hong Kong–Zhuhai–Macau Bridge, which links the cities of Hong Kong, Zhuhai, and Macau at the southern end of the PRD. Construction started in May 2017 with an opening date in 2024.

History 
Shenzhen lobbied hard in the early 2000s to be included in the Hong Kong–Zhuhai–Macau Bridge project through a proposed double-Y-shaped design with one of the extensions connecting Shenzhen to the structure, but the Government of China picked a single-Y-shaped design in 2004, leaving Shenzhen out of the project. The idea of a separate link to connect Shenzhen with Zhongshan was originally proposed in 2008, but was shelved for several years amid concerns it could jeopardize the success of a bridge between Hong Kong, Zhuhai and Macau. It was eventually included in the Guangdong government's 12th five-year plan, unveiled by Guangdong governor Huang Huahua on 9 January 2011.

The project will consist of a 6.7 km tunnel starting on the Shenzhen side, and 19 bridges totaling 43 km. There will be four lanes in each direction, with a maximum speed of 100 km/h. The bridge will join the Guangshen Expressway to the south of Shenzhen airport and the Jihe Expressway to the east of the airport on the eastern side of the delta with the Zhongjiang Expressway on the western side. It will cut travel time from Shenzhen to Zhongshan to less than 30 minutes. 

Analysts from mainland China and Hong Kong found the project might draw as much as 40 percent of the potential traffic away from the Hong Kong–Zhuhai–Macau Bridge and reduce the regional dominance of Hong Kong's airport and harbor.

See also
 List of bridges in China
 Humen Pearl River Bridge
 Lingdingyang Bridge

References

Transport in Guangdong
Pearl River Delta
Proposed bridges in China
Bridges over the Pearl River (China)
Expressways in Shenzhen